Olga (minor planet designation: 304 Olga) is a large Main belt asteroid. It is classified as a C-type asteroid and is probably composed of carbonaceous material.

It was discovered by Johann Palisa on 14 February 1891 in Vienna.

304 Olga was identified as one of three asteroids that were likely to be a parent body for chondrites along with 449 Hamburga and 335 Roberta. All three asteroids were known to have low-albedo (not reflect as much light) and be close to "meteorite producing resonances". Chrondrites are the most common type of meteor found on Earth, accounting for over 80% of all meteors. They are named for the tiny spherical silicate particles that are found inside them (those particles are called chondrules).

References

External links 
 
 

000304
Discoveries by Johann Palisa
Named minor planets
000304
000304
18910214